Rubey Glacier is a broad, heavily crevassed glacier of West Antarctica flowing north to coalesce with the west side of Hull Glacier eastward of Mount Giles, near the coast of Marie Byrd Land. Mapped by United States Geological Survey (USGS) from surveys and U.S. Navy air photos, 1959–65. Named by Advisory Committee on Antarctic Names (US-ACAN) for Captain Ervin B. Rubey, U.S. Navy, Commander of Antarctic Support Activities at McMurdo Station, summer 1969–70.

References

 

Glaciers of Marie Byrd Land